The Salmon War of 1736/37 was a political conflict between the confederate Canton of Basle and the Kingdom of France over fishing rights and the location of their state border in the River Rhine.

Conflicts 

In 1735 and 1736, at the start of the salmon season, there were again insults thrown and mass struggles between the fishermen of Neudorf, Hüningen and Kleinhüningen. On the Hüningen side about two dozen men were involved, on the Kleinhüningen side the figures vary between forty and two hundred. Basle fishermen also interfered on the grounds that the old regulations were no longer valid.

The conflict became a state-level issue through the news that the Obervogt of Kleinhüningen, Jakob Christoph Frey, an official of the Basle Estate, had been involved in the violence of 1736 and organized it out of his own interest. As part of his income, he received a third of the captured fish. In addition, the village guard had beaten his drum, giving the riot the character of a military engagement.

The accusations were denied by Basle, but French officials insisted their information was correct and exerted huge pressure on Basle by the end of the year. From 16 November onwards, they cut off Basle's trading links (in particular food supplies and income) with Alsace, banned Basle's citizens from travelling and arrested three of them in Strasbourg. They also demanded the prosecution of the Kleinhüningen parties and the Obervogt. Last but not least, they officially questioned the existing border markers.

A request for support from Basle to the Swiss states failed due to confessional and political antagonism and the influence of the French Ambassador in Solothurn. The extraordinary meeting demanded by Basle on early January 1737 did not make any decisions. Instead, it was suggested that Basle should back down. The French officials sharply rejected Basle's delegations in Strasbourg and Solothurn and its letters of justification to Paris. A number of arrests in Kleinhüningen and contacts with the Dutch ambassador in Paris did not contribute to a relaxation of tension. There were even rumours that France was planning a military intervention.

Literature 
 Carl Wieland: Der Kleinhüninger Lachsfangstreit 1736. In: Basler Jahrbuch. 1889, pp. 37–85.
 Peter Ochs: Geschichte der Stadt und Landschaft Basel. Vol. 7. Schweighauser, Basle, 1821, Vol. 7, p. 567–579.
 Markus Lutz: Baslerisches Bürger-Buch. Schweighauser, Basle, 1819, p. 124.
 Markus Lutz: Chronik von Basel oder die Hauptmomente der Baslerischen Geschichte. Samuel Flick, Basle, 1809, pp. 292–294.

History of Basel
History of fishing
Fishing conflicts